Sport Inca was a Peruvian football club, located in the city of Lima. The club was founded with the name of club Sport Inca and played in Primera Division Peruana from 1912 until 1921. The club won the national tournament in 1920.

Honours

National
Peruvian Primera División: 1
Winners (1): 1920

See also
List of football clubs in Peru
Peruvian football league system

External links
 La difusión del fútbol en Lima (Spanish)
 RSSSF - Peru - List of Champions
 Peruvian football seasons

Football clubs in Lima